The following are the records of PR China in Olympic weightlifting. Records are maintained in each weight class for the snatch lift, clean and jerk lift, and the total for both lifts by the Chinese Weightlifting Association (CWA).

Men

Women

Historical records

Men (1998–2018)

Women (1998–2018)

References
General
Chinese records – Men 28 January 2022 updated
Chinese records – Women 28 January 2022 updated

Specific

External links
CWA official website
CWA records page

Records
China
Olympic weightlifting
weightlifting